The name Shadowfax may refer to:

 Shadowfax (Middle-earth), a fictional horse ridden by Gandalf the wizard in J. R. R. Tolkien's Lord of the Rings
 Shadowfax (band), a new age/electronic musical group
 Shadowfax (album), an album by this group
 Mount Shadowfax, a mountain in British Columbia